Nucella freycinetii is a species of sea snail, a marine gastropod mollusk in the family Muricidae, the murex snails or rock snails.

Description

Distribution
This marine species occurs off Kamchatka.

References

 Valenciennes, A., 1846 Atlas de Zoologie, Mollusques, Paris, Gide et Cie Ed. in : Du Petit Thouars, 1846. Voyage autour du monde sur la frégate la Vénus pendant les années 1836-1839 ; publié par ordre du roi sous les auspices du Ministre de la Marine, p. 24 pls

External links
 Deshayes, G. P. (1839). Nouvelles espèces de mollusques, provenant des côtes de la Californie, du Mexique, du Kamtschatka et de la Nouvelle-Zélande. Revue Zoologique par la Société Cuvierienne. (1839) 2 (12): 356-361
 Pilsbry, H. A. (1907). New and little-known whelks from northern Japan and the Kuril Islands. Proceedings of the Academy of Natural Sciences of Philadelphia. 59: 243-246, pls. 19-20.

Muricidae
Gastropods described in 1839